The  Electric Deads  was a four-person Danish hardcore punk band with members from Espergærde, Fredensborg and Humlebæk formed in November 1981 by Nils Normann (bass), Kevin Andreasson (guitar, vocal), Bibi Blomstrøm (vocal) and Michael Mortensen (drums).

Electric Deads played along with other Danish bands like The Zero Point, War of Destruction, Razor Blades, Ads, City X, Freshly Riots, Dunderheads, Illegal 80, Vaccinen, Anfall, Kraft Durch Freude (KDF) and Disrespect. But also with Swedish bands Noncens and Das Psycho both from Helsingborg and finish band Kaaos from Tampere, Finland.

Discography
Electric Deads 7-inch EP (Electro Static Records, One dead, 1982). Recorded 2 May 1982 at Marco Polo Studio, Tikøb
Anti-Sex 7-inch EP (Electro Static Records, 2 deads, 1982). Recorded 13 September 1982 at Karma Studie, Copenhagen
Mind Bomb 7-inch EP (Electro Static Records, 3 deads, 1983). Recorded 24 April 1983 at ARP-Studio, Aarhus. Produced & mixed by Johnny Concrete & Electric Deads
“Electric Deads” 7-inch EP. Re-release: Noise and Distortion Records, Noise 014, Belgium, 2010
“Anti-Sex” 7-inch EP. Re-release: Noise and Distortion Records, Noise 015, Belgium, 2010
“Mind-Bomb” 7-inch EP. Re-release: Noise and Distortion Records, Noise 016, Belgium, 2010

Compilations

Welcome to 1984 (Maximumrocknroll Records, 1984)
Complication: A Danish Compilation (Bondeskiver, 1984)
Bloodstains Across Denmark (1997)
Killed By Death #41 (1998)
Killed By Hardcore 3 (2002)

References

External links
Swedish Punk Fanzine: Electric Deads

Danish punk rock groups
Musical groups established in 1981